The 1994 Bonython by-election was held in the Australian federal electorate of Bonython in South Australia on 19 March 1994. The by-election was triggered by the retirement of the sitting member, the Australian Labor Party's Neal Blewett, on 11 February 1994. The writ for the by-election was issued on the same day.

Results

See also
 List of Australian federal by-elections

References

Bonython by-election
South Australian federal by-elections
Bonython by-election